Greendrop Lake is a small lake in Chilliwack Lake Provincial Park, British Columbia, Canada.  It can only be accessed by hiking trails, the shortest of which is 5.3 km in length.

External links
The trail to Greendrop Lake on TrailPeak.com
Greendrop Lake on SharpHooks.com

Lakes of British Columbia
Yale Division Yale Land District